Morgan County Courthouse is a historic courthouse located at Martinsville, Morgan County, Indiana.  It was built between 1857 and 1859, and is a -story, Italianate style brick and stone building.  It has a cruciform plan and features a five-level free-standing campanile.  Additions were made in 1956 and 1975–1976.  Associated with the courthouse is the original annex or Sheriff's House.  It is a two-story, five bay by two-bay, I-house.

It was listed on the National Register of Historic Places in 1996.  It is located in the Martinsville Commercial Historic District.

References

County courthouses in Indiana
Clock towers in Indiana
Courthouses on the National Register of Historic Places in Indiana
Italianate architecture in Indiana
Government buildings completed in 1859
Buildings and structures in Morgan County, Indiana
National Register of Historic Places in Morgan County, Indiana
Historic district contributing properties in Indiana